Jeninah Ntabgoba (at times referred to Jeninah M.N Ntabgoba) is a Ugandan author and former Legislator. She was the elected Woman Constituent Assembly Delegate for Kisoro District in the 1994 Constitutional Assembly  and later represented the same constituency as a Member of Parliament in Uganda's sixth parliament between 1996 and 2001 when she was replaced by Annette Mukabera in the 2001 Ugandan General Election.

Career 
Ntabgoba participated in the 1989 Ugandan general election and was one of the 280 elected Members of Parliament on the National Resistance Council. She was the Woman Representative for Kisoro District.

During the 1994 Ugandan Constituent Assembly elections, Ntabgoba was elected to represent the Women of Kisoro District. She later successfully contested for the position of Woman Member of Parliament for the same constituency and represented it inUganda's sixth parliament.

She was succeeded by Annette Mukabera after defeat in the 2001 Ugandan parliamentary elections

Personal life 
Born Jeninah Mary Nyirandimubakunzi, Ntabgoba was married to former Principal Judge Herbert Ntabgoba

See also 

 Kisoro district
 Parliament of Uganda

References

External links 

 "Listening is fun" in the National Library of Australia Catalogue
 "My Goodnight Book"

Living people
Members of the Parliament of Uganda
People from Kisoro District
Women members of the Parliament of Uganda
Year of birth missing (living people)